Drake C. Dunsmore (born November 4, 1988) is a former American football tight end. Dunsmore attended St. Thomas Aquinas High School. During college, he played for Northwestern. At Northwestern, he was a three-time Academic All-Big Ten Performer and the inaugural Big Ten Kwalick-Clark Tight End of the Year for the 2011 Northwestern Wildcats when he was a first-team All-Big Ten Conference selection. Dunsmore was an honorable mention All-Big Ten selection for the 2010 Wildcats. He holds the Northwestern single-game receiving touchdowns record and the career tight end receiving yards record. Drake Dunsmore is the son of Pat Dunsmore.

High school
Dunsmore finished in fourth place in the 2000 Kansas Kids State Wrestling Tournament in the 10-under age group in the  weight class. Like his National Football League-veteran father, Pat, Drake Dunsmore never played organized football before high school. He was a 2005 honorable mention All-Class 5A State selection as a junior. He was a 2006 first-team All-Class 5A State selection and third-team All-State selection as a senior. Dunsmore was the 20th rated tight end in the national high school class of 2007 according to ESPN and the 15th rated football player in the 2007 class in the state of Kansas according to Rivals.com. He earned three varsity letters in track and two in baseball. Dunsmore chose Northwestern over competing football scholarships from Arizona State, Kansas State, Tulsa and Colorado State for a variety of reasons, including academics, the coaching staff and the fact that two aunts and a grandmother reside close to campus. He declined his invitation to participate in the August 3, 2007, Kansas Shrine Bowl due to his ongoing rehabilitation.

College
2007–08
Dunsmore was one of two Northwestern true freshmen to play for the 2007 Northwestern Wildcats. He had a pair of 35-yard receptions against Duke on September 15, 2007. He was named to the 2007 Sporting News Big Ten All-Freshman Team. Dunsmore redshirted for the 2008 Big Ten Conference football season after injuring his anterior cruciate ligament on the fifth day of practice during his sophomore year.

2009
On September 19, 2009, Dunsmore had a 10-reception, 90-yard effort against Syracuse Orange, including a 22-yard touchdown.  He caught the touchdown that gave the 2009 Wildcats a 14–10 lead over the then-undefeated 9–0 number 4-ranked Iowa Hawkeyes in their 17–10 November 7 victory that gave Northwestern its sixth victory of the season and made them bowl-eligible. In the January 1, 2010 Outback Bowl, he tallied 120 yards receiving on 9 receptions as part of Mike Kafka's 532-yard passing effort against Auburn Tigers. The 66-yard Kafka to Dunsmore touchdown is the longest passing touchdown in Northwestern bowl game history. He was the second leading receiver among Big Ten tight ends (behind Garrett Graham) for the 2009 Big Ten Conference football season although he only started 7 of 13 games in 2009. Dunsmore earned Academic All-Big Ten recognition.

2010
Two of Dunsmore's five receptions were touchdowns in the September 11 victory against Illinois State. He posted an 8-reception effort in a 21–17 victory over a number 13-ranked Iowa team on November 13. Dunsmore earned Academic All-Big Ten recognition a second time. He was a 2010 honorable mention All-Big Ten (coaches and media) selection.

2011
Dunsmore had a four-touchdown, 112-yard game against Indiana in a 59–38 victory on October 29. The four receiving touchdowns set a Northwestern record, while tying a Memorial Stadium record, and earned him Big Ten Offensive Player of the Week. He earned his third Academic All-Big Ten recognition. Dunsmore was a 2011 first-team All-Big Ten (coaches and media) selection. He established the Northwestern career receiving yards record for tight ends of 1567 yards and was one of eight semifinalists for the John Mackey Award. Dunsmore was the inaugural 2011 Big Ten Kwalick-Clark Tight End of the Year.

Pre-draft
Dunsmore finished fifth among tight ends at the NFL Scouting Combine in the 40-yard dash with a time of 4.64. He had a pair of first-place finishes among tight ends in the 3 cone drill with a time of 6.73 and in the 20-yard shuttle with a time of 4.03. He finished third among tight ends in the 60-yard shuttle with a time of 11.47.

Professional career
Dunsmore was selected by the Tampa Bay Buccaneers in the seventh round of the 2012 NFL Draft with the 233rd selection overall. He is one of two Northwestern Wildcats and 41 Big Ten players drafted. He is small for an NFL tight end. According to ESPN's Todd McShay, Dunsmore is projected as a special teams player.

On May 7, 2012, Buccaneers.com announced that Dunsmore had agreed to a four-year deal with Buccaneers, making him officially a member of the Tampa Bay Buccaneers's Roster. The deal was reportedly worth $2.15 million over four years.
 Dunsmore began the 2012 NFL season on the practice squad for the Buccaneers. Following the 2013 NFL Draft and the Buccaneers undrafted free agent signings, Dunsmore retired.

References

External links
Tampa Bay Buccaneers bio
Northwestern Wildcats bio
Dunsmore archive at Chicago Tribune
Stats at ESPN

1988 births
Living people
American football tight ends
Northwestern Wildcats football players
People from Lenexa, Kansas
Place of birth missing (living people)
Players of American football from Kansas
Sportspeople from the Kansas City metropolitan area
Tampa Bay Buccaneers players